Total Castration is a 1991 album by Zeni Geva.  It was produced by Steve Albini. It was rereleased in 2012.

Critical reception
Trouser Press called the album "a groaning mass of gory riff decimation over which Null bellows his harsh, elemental lyrics." Option deemed it a "howling" work, writing that the band "have set noisy pop-punk standards for emotional intensity and sonic onslaught."

Track listing 
 "I Want You" - 4:44
 "Total Castration" - 3:28
 "Bigman Death" - 3:42
 "Shoot Me With Your Blood" - 7:16
 "Godflesh" - 4:40
 "Bloodsex" - 4:51
 "New Flesh" - 2:41
 "I Hate You" - 8:28

Credits 
 Null - vocals, guitars, Words
 Tabata - guitars
 Eito - drums, Metals

References

1991 albums
Zeni Geva albums
Albums produced by Steve Albini